Vineet Anil Kulkarni (born 6 October 1979) is an Indian cricket umpire. Kulkarni made his debut as an umpire in both List A and first-class cricket in 2009.  He served as a member of the ICC International Panel of Umpires in the on-field category and officiated in 25 One Day Internationals (ODIs) and 14 Twenty20 Internationals (T20Is). He made his T20I umpiring debut in 2012 and a year later he made his ODI debut as an umpire in 2013.<ref name="Cricinfo"></>

See also
 List of One Day International cricket umpires
 List of Twenty20 International cricket umpires

References

1979 births
Living people
Indian cricket umpires
Indian One Day International cricket umpires
Indian Twenty20 International cricket umpires
Cricketers from Pune